Aberdeen is an unincorporated community in Cass Township, Ohio County, in the U.S. state of Indiana.

History
The first settlement at Aberdeen was made in about 1814. It was named after Aberdeen, in Scotland.

A post office was established at Aberdeen in 1852, and remained in operation until it was discontinued in 1880.

Geography
Aberdeen is located at  (38.9053377, -84.9874511). Aberdeen is off of Indiana State Road 56 at the intersection of Aberdeen Rd. and Cass-Union Rd.

References

Unincorporated communities in Indiana
Unincorporated communities in Ohio County, Indiana